Herbert John Ronald Friedeburg-Seeley (February 21, 1913 - December 16, 2007) was an English sociologist and author in Canada and the United States. Some of his works include The Americanization of the Unconscious and Crestwood Heights.

Early life 
Seeley was the son of Emil Friedeburg, a wealthy Prussian grain executive with what is presently Bunge and Co. His mother was English citizen Lilly Etta Seeley. Seeley was born into the aristocratic class of London. He had three brothers- Frank, Cyril, and Michael. The boys were educated at various European boarding schools. At age 17, Seeley left England for North America where he would earn his advanced degrees.

Career 
Seeley served in the Canadian Army from 1939 to 1945. He then completed a graduate & doctoral degree at the University of Chicago. He and his young family then lived in the upscale Forest Hills area of Toronto for several years while he worked on a project there. "The fraction of the Forest Hills work reported out in Crestwood Heights  was Seeley's first major publication, and established his professional presence. Crestwood Heights was the first full-scale sociological study of a suburban community, and the first psychologically-oriented anthropological study of a community as such." Seeley went on to help charter York University. Moving his family to Boston, he next taught as an adjunct professor at Brandeis University whilst working as a sociologist at Massachusetts Institute of Technology. And finally, he worked at Stanford University, settling his family in California.

References 

1913 births
2007 deaths
20th-century American writers
American sociologists
Brandeis University faculty
Canadian military personnel of World War II
MIT School of Humanities, Arts, and Social Sciences faculty
University of Chicago alumni
American male writers
British expatriates in Canada
British emigrants to the United States